The Philippine Constabulary (PC) Metropolitan Command or MetroCom (COMMET) was created pursuant to Executive Order of President Ferdinand Marcos on July 14, 1967, to supplement police forces within the Greater Manila Area and combat all forms of criminal activity.

Establishment and mission
In the late 1960s, mobile patrol coverage of the metropolitan Manila area was considered inadequate due to increasing crime which strained the capabilities of the local police forces. On July 14, 1967, President Ferdinand Marcos directed the organization of a special force to be known as the PC Metropolitan Command (MetroCom). It was to operate in the City of Manila, Quezon City, Caloocan and Pasay, and in the municipalities of Las Piñas, Malabon, Marikina, Makati, Mandaluyong, Navotas, Parañaque, Pasig, Pateros, San Juan, and Taguig.

As crime continued to increase and become more severe in the greater Manila area, and smuggling and illegal fishing in Manila Bay became rampant, President Marcos issued Executive Order 120 on February 16, 1968, which expanded MetroCom into a Metropolitan Area Command (MAC). MetroCom proved to be an efficient force supporting the municipal and city police forces in the Manila area.

On July 8, 1974, President Marcos issued Presidential Decree No. 421, making MetroCom the basis for a regional police command for the future Metro Manila region. All local police departments within the capital area were joined under national government control as the Metropolitan Police Force (MPF) and overseen by the commander of MetroCom. On August 8, 8, 1975, Presidential Decree 765 was issued to integrate the Philippine Constabulary with the Integrated National Police (INP) as a renewed service branch of the Armed Forces, not just for national defense but for the protection of public security and order. With this act, MetroCom and MPF were united under joint command. By November 1975, with the formal designation of the National Capital Region, MetroCom was extended to cover what was then the municipality of Valenzuela.

Dissolution and replacement 
Following the People Power Revolution in 1986, the PC-INP was replaced by the Philippine National Police (PNP) by an act of Congress in 1991. From 1986 to 1991, in line with the democratization of the police forces, MetroCom was renamed the PC Capital Region Command (PCCAPCOM, Spanish:Comando del Región Capital de la Constabularia Filipina, COMRECAP-CF). In 1992, it was again renamed the PNP Capital Region Command (PNPCAPCOM, Comando del Región Capital de la Polícia Nacional), the basis of the current National Capital Region Police Office.

Equipment
PC METROCOM use the Toyota Crown, the Datsun 2000 and the Mini-Moke.

Sources

The Constable, July 1971 Edition

References 

Law enforcement in Metro Manila
History of Metro Manila
Establishments by Philippine executive order